The Battle of Lutos occurred in 794 when the Emir of Cordoba, Hisham I sent military incursions against the Kingdom of Asturias under the command of the brothers Abd al-Karim ibn Abd al-Walid ibn Mugaith and Abd al-Malik ibn Abd al-Walid ibn Mugaith.

The battle
Abd al-Karim carried out a scorched earth campaign of aggression against the lands of Álava, whilst his brother Abd al-Malik directed his forces into the heart of the Asturian Kingdom without encountering significant resistance aside from the town of Oviedo. He ravaged much of the countryside, including churches built by Fruela I of Asturias. Upon their return to Al-Andalus, in the valley of Camino Real del Puerto de la Mesa, they were set upon by King Alfonso II of Asturias and the forces under his command. The Asturian forces ambushed the Muslim army in a part of the valley near Grado, Asturias that has been considered by historians to be the area around Los Lodos. The battle resulted in an Asturian victory and the majority of the invading Muslim army was wiped out. Abd al-Malik was killed in the action.

References

Sources

Batalla de Lutos (794)

Lutos
Lutos
Lutos
Lutos
794
8th century in Al-Andalus